

Diora (or Deora) was a medieval Bishop of Rochester.

Diora was consecrated between 765 and 772. He died between 781 and 785. Around 779 or so King Ethelbert granted land inside the city of Rochester to Diora and his cathedral clergy.

Citations

References

External links
 

Bishops of Rochester
8th-century English bishops